Hemerobius humulinus is a species of brown lacewing in the family Hemerobiidae. It is found in Europe and Northern Asia (excluding China), North America, and Southern Asia.

References

Further reading

External links

 

Hemerobiiformia
Insects described in 1758
Taxa named by Carl Linnaeus